Al Badayea is one of the governorates in Al-Qassim Region, Saudi Arabia. Al Badayea considered to be one of the agricultural governorates in Qassim, as it is located in the middle of Al Qassim.

References 

Populated places in Al-Qassim Province
Governorates of Saudi Arabia